Defending champion Esther Vergeer defeated Korie Homan in the final, 6–2, 6–2 to win the women's singles wheelchair tennis title at the 2008 French Open.

Seeds
 Esther Vergeer (champion)
 Korie Homan (final)

Draw

Finals

References

External links
Draw

Wheelchair Women's Singles
French Open, 2008 Women's Singles